

The CANSA C.6 was a training biplane developed in Italy during World War II. It was intended as an aerobatic intermediate trainer for the Regia Aeronautica and was of conventional tailskid configuration with a single-bay wing cellule with swept outer panels. Two prototypes were constructed, the single-seat C.6 and the two-seat C.6B, but no production order ensued.

Specifications (C.6B)

References
 
 
 aerei-italiani.net

C.6
1940s Italian military trainer aircraft